Errol Sadler (born September 16, 1982) is an American film producer. Sadler is the founder-CEO of Supremacy Films, an Atlanta, Georgia-based film production company that specializes in the development, packaging, financing and production of independent films.  Sadler also works closely with Brandon Thaxton on numerous film productions in the Atlanta area.

Career
In 2009, Sadler made his producer debut with “Eros”, a short dramatic thriller dealing with the repercussions of love, lies and deception. An instant success, it received a Comcast On-demand distribution deal. Sadler then partnered with Last Looks Inc. to produce four short films “Up in Smoke" starring Brad James as Chase, “No Crime”, “Letters to a Father" starring Jasmine Burke, and “Prognosis”, a story about Marcus Ford whose prognosis sends him into a violent spiraling frenzy. This dramatic action short featured Doris Morgado, Dwayne Boyd, and Valerie Sue Love These films have been part of numerous film festivals such as the Atlanta Black Film Festival (ABFF), Brooklyn Short Film Festival (BSFF), Long Island Film Festival (LIFF), Manhattan Film Festival (MIFF), Peachtree Village International Film Festival (PVIFF), and the Women in Film and Television (WIFTA).

His partnership with Reel One Entertainment, an Atlanta-based production company, stemmed the action packed film BlackHats. He produced and starred as Elisha beside Doris Morgado. Elisha was a reformed, hot-tempered bounty hunter, who finds his new harmonious life as a fugitive recovery agent threatened. Next Sadler produced Curveball featuring Lynn Whitfield and Rockmond Dunbar. Curveball is the coming-of-age story of a boy named Nolan as he faces several challenges in his life which he must learn to conquer without the help of his mother or counselor.

Joining forces with Symmetry Entertainment and C. Clear Cinema, Sadler produced Echo At 11 Oak Drive, a feature-length film of three stories that transpire under the same roof during three different eras of time: 1951, 1973, and 2010. It was screened at Sundance in 2013 and received great reviews. He has several projects pending, "Echoes", a short of the same story line was accepted into the 2013 Cannes Film Festival and is pending a distribution deal. Partnering again with Reel One Entertainment an untitled boxing film was slated to start principal photography in 2017. Sadler and Shadow Motion Picture, a Los Angeles-based production company, are slated to produce the feature-length film Fixer based on the sisterhood of female assassins. A deal with director R.L. Scott is in the works to produce an action-packed boxing flick.

Filmography

References

External links
 SupremacyFilms.com
 itsrobinlori.com

1982 births
Film producers from New York (state)
21st-century American male actors
People from Brooklyn
Living people
People from Kingston Parish
American chief executives